Fighter Squadron 192 (VF-192) was used two times in United States Navy Carrier Air Wing NINETEEN (CVG-19)(2nd) which was disestablished in 1977.
 
24 Aug 1948-15 Feb 1950  - VF-114 disestablished 1993
15 Feb 1950-15 Mar 1956 - VFA-192 active

See also
List of inactive United States Navy aircraft squadrons (VF)

Aircraft squadrons of the United States Navy
Strike fighter squadrons of the United States Navy